Overtown may refer to:

 Overtown (Miami), a neighborhood of Miami, Florida, United States
 Overtown, Lancashire, England, UK
 Overtown, North Lanarkshire, Scotland, UK
 Overtown, West Yorkshire, England, UK
 Overtown, Wiltshire, England, UK

See also

 Overton (disambiguation)
 Overtones (disambiguation)
 
 Over (disambiguation)
 Town (disambiguation)